Short track speed skating at the 2022 Winter Olympics are scheduled to be held at the Capital Indoor Stadium in Beijing, China. The events are scheduled to take place between 5 and 16 February 2022. A total of nine short track speed skating events will be held.

In July 2018, the International Olympic Committee (IOC) officially added the mixed relay held over a distance of 2000 metres, increasing the total number of events to nine. Due to the addition of the event, the competition schedule was increased to six days from five.

A total of 112 quota spots (56 per gender) were distributed to the sport, a decline of eight from the 2018 Winter Olympics. A total of nine events were contested, four for men, four for women and one mixed.

Qualification

A total quota of 112 athletes are scheduled to compete (56 men and 56 women). Countries were assigned quotas using the results of the entire 2020–21 World Cup in the autumn of 2021. Each nation was permitted to enter a maximum of five athletes per gender if it qualified a relay team and three if it did not. There were a maximum of thirty-two qualifiers for the 500m and 1000m events; thirty-six for the 1500m events; eight for the single gender relays, and 12 for the mixed relay. At the end of qualification, the International Skating Union confirmed 58 men and 54 women earned quota spots, which meant two quota spots were transferred from women to men.

Competition schedule
The following was the competition schedule for all nine events. Sessions that included the event finals are shown in bold.

All times are (UTC+8).

Medal summary

Medal table

Men's events

Women's events

Mixed event

 Skaters who did not participate in the final, but received medals.

Records

World records (WR) and  Olympic records (OR) set during the competition.

Participating nations
A total of 112 athletes from 22 nations (including the IOC's designation of ROC for the Russian Olympic Committee) qualified to participate. Turkey made its debut in the sport at these Winter Olympics.

The numbers in parenthesis represents the number of participants entered.

Controversy
The Men's 1000 meters event was marred by controversy. During the semifinals, Hwang Dae-heon of South Korea was disqualified for an "illegal late pass causing contact", and Lee June-seo of South Korea were penalized for a lane change that caused contact, allowing Li Wenlong from China to qualify for the A final joining two countrymen. Then, after the conclusion of the A final, Shaolin Sandor Liu of Hungary was disqualified for a "straight lane change from inside to out causing contact” and an “arm block at the finish", resulting in Ren Ziwei and Li from China being awarded the gold and silver medals respectively The International Skating Union received and rejected two protests from Hungary and South Korea on February 7, 2022. The International Skating Union stated that they reviewed the incident with the Video Referee and rejected the protests, standing by the original decisions made by the Chief Referee. 

Australian former Olympic gold medalist Steven Bradbury said, "nothing could be more favorable for the Chinese team with the judges than what’s happened tonight here in Beijing". While Stephen Gough, head coach of the U.S. team, stated that he did not believe that the Chinese team should have been penalized.

However, the Korean Sport & Olympic Committee later filed an official appeal with the Court of Arbitration for Sport over the disqualification of two of the South Korean athletes from the men's 1000 metres speedskating event semifinals.

During the 5000 metres relay event, in the semifinals of the event, the Chinese team fell with 10 laps to go. There was no obvious obstruction on the Chinese skater, but they were advanced to the A final, with no team disqualified during the race. The Chinese team were advanced, even though they finished last in the race and there was no impeding action on the team.

References

External links
Official Results Book – Short Track Speed Skating

Short track speed skating at the 2022 Winter Olympics
Short track speed skating
2022
Winter Olympics